{{Infobox film
| name           = Outcast of the Islands
| image          = Outcast of the Islands poster.jpg
| image_size     = 
| caption        = original movie poster
| director       = Carol Reed
| producer       = Carol Reed<ref>{{cite web|url=http://www.screenonline.org.uk/people/id/446996/credits.html|title=Alexander Korda Film Credits}} - B.F.I. Retrieved 2016-01-10</ref>
| based_on       = 
| screenplay     = William Fairchild
| narrator       = 
| starring       = Trevor HowardRalph RichardsonRobert MorleyWendy Hiller
| music          = Brian Easdale
| cinematography = Edward ScaifeJohn Wilcox
| editing        = Bert Bates
| color_process  = Black and white
| studio         = London Film Productions
| distributor    = British Lion Films Corporation
| released       = 
| runtime        = 100 minutes
| country        = United Kingdom
| language       = English
| budget         = 
| gross          = £149,335 (UK)
}}Outcast of the Islands is a 1951 British adventure drama film directed by Carol Reed based on Joseph Conrad's 1896 novel An Outcast of the Islands. The film features Trevor Howard, Ralph Richardson, Robert Morley and Wendy Hiller.

Plot
Peter Willems (Trevor Howard), a selfish and ambitious man, is accused of stealing in his position as manager of a shipping port operation near Singapore. After he is dismissed for his misconduct he reacquaints himself with the trading ship Capt. Lingard (Ralph Richardson) who befriended him as a 12-year-old boy. Lingard agrees to help Willems regain his reputation by taking him to a trading village located up a difficult-to-navigate channel near the coast of Batam. Lingard's son-in-law, Elmer Almayer (Robert Morley), operates a trading operation for Capt. Lingard in the village. Lingard asks Almayer to take Willems under his wing and teach him the business. While Lingard is away on one of his sea trips, Willems abuses his trust, seduces the village chieftain's daughter Aissa (Kerima), attempts to steal Almayer's business operation, humiliates Almayer before the villagers, and shares the navigation secrets of the channel with an Arab trader who competes with Capt. Lingard. Lingard returns to discover the mess Willems has made and confronts Willems – who has now been condemned by the villagers because of the shame he brought to the frail and dying chieftain. He abandons Willems to live in isolation and exile.

Cast
 Trevor Howard as Willems
 Ralph Richardson as Captain Lingard
 Robert Morley as Elmer Almayer
 Wendy Hiller as Mrs. Almayer
 Kerima as Aissa
 George Coulouris as Babalatchi
 Tamine as Tamine 
 Wilfred Hyde-White as Vinck (as Wildrid Hyde White)
 Peter Illing as Alagappa
 Betty Ann Davies as Mrs Williams
 Frederick Valk as Hudig
 A.V. Bramble as Badavi 
 Marne Maitland as Ships Mate
 James Kenney as Ramsey
 Annabel Morley as Nina Almayer
 Ranjana as Dancing by (as T. Ranjana)
 K. Gurunanse as Dancing by

Production
In the wake of the success of The Blue Lagoon, Alexander Korda was able to get funding for a movie version of Outcast. Outcast of the Islands was filmed on location in Ceylon (now Sri Lanka) and at Shepperton Studios in England.

ReceptionOutcast of the Islands'' was nominated for best British film and best film from any source at the 1953 BAFTA awards.

References

External links
 
 
 

1952 films
1952 adventure films
British historical adventure films
Films based on works by Joseph Conrad
Films shot in Sri Lanka
Films based on British novels
Films set in Singapore
Films set in Indonesia
Films set in the 19th century
London Films films
Films directed by Carol Reed
1950s historical adventure films
Films shot at Shepperton Studios
British Lion Films films
British black-and-white films
1950s English-language films
1950s British films